The globe artichoke (Cynara cardunculus var. scolymus) is a species of thistle cultivated as a food. Artichoke may also refer to:

Plants
Artichoke cactus, a species of cactus
Jerusalem artichoke, a species of sunflower with an edible tuber
Stachys affinis, also known as Chinese artichoke or Artichoke betony, an herbaceous perennial plant of the family Lamiaceae
 Artichoke Garlic

Places
Artichoke, Minnesota, an unincorporated community in the United States
Artichoke Lake, a lake in Minnesota
Artichoke River, a river of Minnesota, United States
Artichoke Township, Minnesota, a civil township in the United States

Other uses
Artichoke (band), an indie pop band in Los Angeles
Artichoke (company), a creative company specialising in arts events
Artichoke Creek (disambiguation)
PH Artichoke, a designer light fixture manufactured by Louis Poulsen
Project ARTICHOKE, a CIA operation
Artichoke gall, a growth caused by a wasp on oak trees